Marjan Stojkovski (born 7 July 1965) is a retired Macedonian football midfielder.

International career
He made his senior debut for Macedonia in a May 1994 friendly match against Albania in which he immediately scored, and has earned a total of 4 caps, scoring 1 goal. His final international was an April 1995 European Championship qualification match against Denmark.

References

External sources

1965 births
Living people
Association football midfielders
Yugoslav footballers
Macedonian footballers
North Macedonia international footballers
FK Pobeda players
FK Makedonija Gjorče Petrov players
FK Vardar players
Macedonian First Football League players